Sanqiao is a town in Daozhen Gelao and Miao Autonomous County, Guizhou, China.

Administrative division
As of 2016, the town is divided into eight villages: 
 Qiaotang
 Xiajiagou
 Tang
 Fengshan
 Xinsheng
 Beiyuan
 Chengjiaba
 Jielong

Geography

References

Bibliography

Towns of Zunyi